Table Island is an uninhabited island within the Arctic Archipelago in the territory of Nunavut. It lies in Norwegian Bay, north of Devon Island, and is also south Cornwall Island, separated by Belcher Channel.

External links
 Table Island in the Atlas of Canada - Toporama; Natural Resources Canada

Islands of the Queen Elizabeth Islands
Uninhabited islands of Qikiqtaaluk Region